Audrey Puente (born March 3, 1970) is an Emmy Award winning American meteorologist. She brings the weather for the weekend news at 6 and 10 p.m. on WNYW in New York City. She also fills in on Good Day New York.

Early life and education 
Was born to mother Margie and father Tito Puente, a musician, songwriter and record producer. She is the sister of musician Tito Puente, Jr..

She studied speech communication at Syracuse University and served an apprenticeship at Hunter College. She received her Masters of Science in Geosciences with an emphasis on meteorology from Mississippi State University.

Career 
Puente is a news celebrity, meteorologist, and emcee, who works from New York City.

Puente succeeded WWOR-TV veteran meteorologist Storm Field in January 2007 as the station's main meteorologist, and served in that capacity until WWOR cancelled the evening newscast in July 2013. She has been the weekend meteorologist at WNYW since late 2012, and the main fill-in meteorologist for the channel.

In 2016 she and news anchor Dari Alexander co-hosted a short-lived lifestyle show on WNYW called The D&A Show.

She previously provided weather forecasts for WCBS-TV's Channel 2 News This Morning and CBS 2 News at Noon. On January 1, 2007 WCBS hired John Elliott to take her position. Before WCBS she worked as the weekend morning meteorologist for WNBC starting in 1999. In the mid-1990s, she was a meteorologist at WJCL and WTGS television in Savannah, Georgia, and WAPT in Jackson, Mississippi. She also periodically filled in for Dave Price on CBS's The Early Show.

Personal life 
In September 2000, Puente accepted an award at the inaugural Latin Grammy Awards ceremony in Los Angeles on behalf of her father, who had died in June of that year.

Puente has been married to Jay Thompson since September 18, 2004. She has three children.

References

Further reading

External links
Official biography from WWOR-TV

1970 births
Living people
American people of Puerto Rican descent
Mississippi State University alumni
Television anchors from New York City
Television meteorologists from New York (state)
Television meteorologists in New York City
Syracuse University alumni
Weather presenters
Scientists from New York (state)
Hunter College alumni